Bradford Lock is situated at Bradford on Avon on the Kennet and Avon Canal, England.

It was in Bradford on Avon that the first sod was cut for the Kennet and Avon Canal in 1794.  The lock has a rise/fall of 12 ft 6 inches (3.81 m).

There are moorings above and below Bradford Lock. Next to the canal, a little way west of the lock, is a huge 14th-century tithe barn.
Beside the lock is Bradford Wharf where there are several historical buildings associated with the canal. The Wharfinger's House was the home of the Canal Company employee who managed the wharf. Across the canal was a gauging dock where canal boats were measured and weighed to determine toll rates.

Gallery

References

See also

Locks on the Kennet and Avon Canal

Locks on the Kennet and Avon Canal
Canals in Wiltshire
Bradford-on-Avon